Myogadani Dam is a gravity dam located in Tottori prefecture in Japan. The dam is used for power production. The catchment area of the dam is 50.4 km2. The dam impounds about 5  ha of land when full and can store 612 thousand cubic meters of water. The construction of the dam was started on 1958 and completed in 1960.

References

Dams in Tottori Prefecture
1960 establishments in Japan